The 2000 Major League Soccer All-Star Game was the fifth MLS All-Star Game. It was played on July 29, 2000 at Columbus Crew Stadium in Columbus, Ohio. In the highest scoring MLS All-Star Game, the Eastern Conference won 9-4.

Players from the league's three division were divided into East and West teams, decided by fans through voting online and at stadiums and stores.

Match details

Assistant referees: George VergaraRobert Fereday

References

External links
 2000 MLS All-Star Game Recap

MLS All-Star Game
All-Star Game
MLS All-Star
Sports competitions in Columbus, Ohio
21st century in Columbus, Ohio
July 2000 sports events in the United States